Antoniano may refer to:

 Antoniano (name)
 CA Antoniano, a Spanish football team based in Lebrija, Province of Seville
 Institute of Antoniano, an educational and charitable institution in Bologna, Italy

See also
 Piccolo Coro dell'Antoniano, children's choir in Bologna, Italy
 
 Antoniana (disambiguation)
 Antonino (disambiguation)